Luigi Fabbri (1877–1935) was an Italian anarchist, writer, and educator, who was charged with defeatism during World War I. He was the father of Luce Fabbri.

Selected works 
Life of Malatesta, translated by Adam Wight (originally published 1936). This book was published again with expanded content in 1945.
Malatesta: L'Uomo e il Pensiero
Letters to a Woman on Anarchy, 1905
Workers' Organisation and Anarchy, 1906 pamphlet
Anarchist Organisation, 1907 pamphlet
The School and the Revolution, 1912
Letters to a Socialist, 1913
The Aware Generation, 1913
Bourgeois Influences on Anarchism, 1914
Dictatorship and Revolution, 1921
Preventive Counter-revolution, 1922

Further reading

External links 
 
 Luigi Fabbri Papers at the International Institute of Social History

1877 births
1935 deaths
Anarchist writers
Anarcho-communists
Italian anarchists
Italian anti-fascists
Italian anti-capitalists
Italian libertarians
Non-interventionism
People from Fabriano